John M. Koenig (born September 24, 1958) is an American diplomat who served as the United States Ambassador to Cyprus from 2012 to 2015.

Early life and education
Koenig was born in Tacoma, Washington. As a teenager, he visited Pakistan with a family friend and was later an exchange student. He earned a B.A. in anthropology from the University of Washington and a master's degree in foreign relations from Johns Hopkins University.

Career
A career foreign service officer, he has held assignments in Belgium, Greece, Indonesia, Italy and the Philippines. He served as Deputy Chief of Mission at the U.S. embassy in Berlin. He was confirmed as Ambassador to Cyprus by the U.S. Senate on August 2, 2012. Sworn in on August 17, 2012, Koenig presented his credentials to Cypriot president Demetris Christofias on September 12, 2012. The assignment ended when he was replaced by Kathleen A. Doherty on Oct. 7, 2015.

References

External links 
 Official Site

1958 births
Ambassadors of the United States to Cyprus
Johns Hopkins University alumni
Living people
People from Tacoma, Washington
University of Washington College of Arts and Sciences alumni
United States Foreign Service personnel
21st-century American diplomats